Associazione Sportiva Roma had a rather average season, but finished solidly inside the top half of Serie A with a sixth place. German striker Rudi Völler had his best season at Roma, scoring 14 league goals, whilst Stefano Desideri hit 10 goals. The greatest success of Roma's season was the Primavera team winning the national championship.

Players

Goalkeepers
  Franco Tancredi
  Giovanni Cervone
  Ferro Tontini

Defenders
  Antonio Comi
  Sebastiano Nela
  Thomas Berthold
  Lionello Manfredonia
  Manuel Gerolin
  Antonio Tempestilli
  Stefano Pellegrini
  Fabio Petruzzi

Midfielders
  Bruno Conti
  Fabrizio Di Mauro
  Stefano Desideri
  Giuseppe Giannini
  Alessandro Cucciari
  Stefano Impallomeni
  Giovanni Piacentini
  Giampiero Maini
  Francesco Statuto

Forwards
  Ruggiero Rizzitelli
  Rudi Völler
  Paolo Baldieri
  Roberto Muzzi

Competitions

Serie A

League table

Results summary

Results by round

Matches

Coppa Italia

First round

Second round

Group phase-Group A

Semifinals

Statistics

Goalscorers
  Rudi Völler 14 (2)
  Stefano Desideri 10
  Ruggiero Rizzitelli 5
  Antonio Tempestilli 3
  Giuseppe Giannini 3
  Manuel Gerolin 3

References

A.S. Roma seasons
Roma